Geoff Taylor (born 1946 in Lancaster) is an English fantasy artist.

Taylor has illustrated books for famous fantasy writers such as Robert Holdstock, Philip K. Dick, David and Leigh Eddings, Graham Edwards, Raymond E. Feist, Katharine Kerr, J. R. R. Tolkien, Roger Zelazny, and David Zindell.  Taylor is also known for his illustrations for Jeff Wayne's Musical Version of The War of the Worlds, and the Chronicles of Ancient Darkness. Since 1991 he has painted some of the rich imagery for Games Workshop and their unique Warhammer World, in addition to painting covers for the Black Library, an offshoot of Games Workshop, and gaming cards for Sabertooth Games.

Bibliography

References

External links
 

1946 births
English illustrators
Fantasy artists
Games Workshop artists
Living people
People from Lancaster, Lancashire